The World Football Elo Ratings are a ranking system for men's national association football teams that is published by the website eloratings.net. It is based on the Elo rating system but includes modifications to take various football-specific variables into account, like the margin of victory, importance of a match, and home field advantage. Other implementations of the Elo rating system are possible and there is no single nor any official Elo ranking for football teams.

Since being developed, the Elo rankings have been found to have the highest predictive capability for football matches. FIFA's official rankings, both the FIFA World Rankings for men and the FIFA Women's World Rankings are based on a modified version of the Elo formula, the men's rankings having switched away from FIFA's own system for matches played since June 2018.

History and overview 

The Elo system, developed by Hungarian-American mathematician Árpád Élő, is used by FIDE, the international chess federation, to rate chess players, and by the European Go Federation, to rate Go players. In 1997, Bob Runyan adapted the Elo rating system to international football and posted the results on the Internet. He was also the first maintainer of the World Football Elo Ratings web site, currently maintained by Kirill Bulygin. Other implementations of the Elo rating system are possible.

The Elo system was adapted for football by adding a weighting for the kind of match, an adjustment for the home team advantage, and an adjustment for goal difference in the match result.

The ratings consider all official international matches for which results are available. Ratings tend to converge on a team's true strength relative to its competitors after about 30 matches. Ratings for teams with fewer than 30 matches are considered provisional.

Comparison with other systems
A 2009 comparative study of eight methods found that the implementation of the Elo rating system described below had the highest predictive capability for football matches, while the men's FIFA ranking method (2006–2018 system) performed poorly.

The FIFA World Rankings is the official national teams rating system used by the international governing body of football. The FIFA Women's World Rankings system has used a modified version of the Elo formula since 2003. In June 2018, the FIFA ranking switched to an Elo-based ranking as well, starting from the current FIFA rating points. The major difference between the World Football Elo Rating and the new men's FIFA rating system is that the latter does not consider goal differential and counts a penalty shoot-out as a win/loss rather than a draw (neither method distinguishes a win in extra time from a win in regular time).

Calculation principles

The ratings are based on the following formula:

where

Where;

"Points Change" is rounded to the nearest integer before updating the team rating.

Status of match
The status of the match is incorporated by the use of a weight constant. The constant reflects the importance of a match, which, in turn, is determined entirely by which tournament the match is in; the weight constant for each major tournament is:

The FIFA adaptation of the Elo rating features 8 weights, with the knockout stages in the World Cup weighing 12 times more than some friendly matches.

Number of goals
The number of goals is taken into account by use of a goal difference index.

If the game is a draw or is won by one goal

If the game is won by two goals

If the game is won by three or more goals:
Where N is the goal difference ( N ≥ 3)

Table of examples:

Result of match
W is the result of the game (1 for a win, 0.5 for a draw, and 0 for a loss). This also holds when a game is won or lost in extra time. If the match is decided on penalties, however, the result of the game is considered a draw (W = 0.5).

Expected result of match
We is the expected result (win expectancy with a draw counting as 0.5) from the following formula:

where dr equals the difference in ratings (add 100 points for the home team). So dr of 0 gives 0.5, of 120 gives 0.666 to the higher-ranked team and 0.334 to the lower, and of 800 gives 0.99 to the higher-ranked team and 0.01 to the lower.

The FIFA adaptation of the Elo rating does not incorporate a home team advantage and has a larger divisor in the formula (600 vs 400), making the points exchange less sensitive to the rating difference of two teams.

Examples for clarification

The same example of a three-team friendly tournament on neutral territory is used as on the FIFA World Rankings page. Beforehand team A had a rating of 630 points, team B 500 points, and teams C 480 points.The first table shows the points allocations based on three possible outcomes of the match between the strongest team A, and the somewhat weaker team B:

When the difference in strength between the two teams is less, so also will be the difference in points allocation. The next table illustrates how the points would be divided following the same results as above, but with two roughly equally ranked teams, B and C, being involved:

See also
Statistical association football predictions

References

External links
Website

Association football rankings
Rating systems